Mira Hamermesh (15 July 1923 - 19 February 2012) was an independent Polish filmmaker and artist who made documentaries for British television.  She was a student of painting at the Bezalel Art School in Jerusalem and later moved to London to study at the Slade School of Art.  Mira returned to Poland in 1960 to study at the polish film school where she began documenting her personal experience of fleeing Nazi occupied Germany as a Jewish teenager.

Early life and education 
Mira Hamermesh was born in Lodz, Poland in 1923.  She was the youngest of three children and lived with her middle class parents in Lodz, where her father ran a rubber factory.

In November 1939, Mira chose to leave Poland, with her younger brother Mietek, after the Germans invaded on 5 September 1939. Mira managed to make it to Palestine in 1941, where she was reunited with her sister Genia. Mira's mother died in the Łódź Ghetto and her father was murdered in Auschwitz.

Mira first studied painting at the Bezalel Art School in Poland before moving to London to study at the Slade School of Art and finally returned to Poland in 1960 to attend Polish Film School.

Career 
Mira was given an exhibition by the British Council in 1946 and was awarded a solo exhibition in 1960 from the Brook Street Gallery.  She returned to her hometown of Lodz in 1960 and began making films.

She published her personal memoir, The River of Angry Dogs: a memoir in 2004. 

Aged 88, Mira Hamermesh died in London, Uk, on 19 February 2012.

References

Polish documentary film directors
Polish expatriates in Mandatory Palestine
2012 deaths
1923 births
Polish expatriates in the United Kingdom
Polish women film directors